Predrag Gojković Cune (Serbian Cyrillic: Предраг Гојковић Цуне; 6 November 1932 – 21 July 2017) was a Serbian vocalist and recording artist with a career spanning six decades.

Biography
In 1939, he enrolled in primary school and subsequently enrolled in the 8th Men's Gymnasium in Belgrade, alongside actors Velimir Bata Živojinović and Danilo Bata Stojković. After high school, he attended the Trade Academy — which he never finished due to his love for singing.

Gojković performed in the late 1950s with Silvana Armenulić, accompanied by an orchestra. The two recorded an LP, released on 6 July 1973. The album featured two songs: "Gdje si da si moj golube" and "Kad u jesen lišće žuti". Gojković was awarded the Order of Merits for the People by the President of Yugoslavia, Josip Broz Tito.

By the early 2010s, Gojković began scaling back his performing schedule. In July 2010 he said: "performance anxiety is something I still have in abundance. I rarely sing and since the voice needs constant training, I'm simply not able to maintain the level that the audience is used to from me. Anxiety affects the quality of your voice, but my experience helps me overcome it". In November 2011, he added: "I want to calm down. I wish for my career to simply fade out without much spectacle".

On his 83rd birthday, he received RTS's "Golden Microphone" for "extraordinary contributions in the field of Serbia's culture with a brilliant talent spanning over six  decades."

Death
Gojković died on 21 July 2017, at age 84, in Belgrade. Many artists from all over the former Yugoslavia publicly gave condolences to the family and expressed grief over his death. The Minister of Culture of Serbia Vladan Vukosavljević expressed his grief via telegram to Predrag's family.

Gojković is interred in the Alley of Distinguished Citizens in the Belgrade New Cemetery.

Discography

Albums
 1961. Halisko (PGP RTB)
 1973. Nestaćeš iz mog života (Jugoton)
 1973. Cune (PGP RTB)
 1975. Zašto svićeš tako rano (PGP RTB)
 1979. Cune i Orkestar Mije Krnjevca - Predrag Cune Gojković (Beograd Disk)
 1980. Ja prošetah kraj Morave - Cune i Snežana Đurišić (Diskoton)
 1980. Cune Gojković i Dragan Toković - U Novom Sadu, Ej (PGP RTB)
 1981. Ne mogu ti ništa osim cveća dati (Jugoton)
 1981. Janičar (Jugoton)
 1981. Predrag Gojković Cune i Mile Bogdanović - Ko zna više (Sarajevo Disk)
 1987. Nezaboravne melodije (1987) (ZKP RLTV)
 1988. Ko to kaže Srbija je mala (PGP RTB)
 2001. Predrag Cune Gojković (Grand Production)
 2002. Nestao je san (Grand Production)

EP and singles

Compilations 
 1973. Cune (PGP RTB)
 1993. Zapevajmo pesme stare 1 (Lunar records)
 1993. Zapevajmo pesme stare 2 (Lunar records)
 1997. Kafu mi draga ispeci (Folk estrada)
 1999. Pedeset godina sa vama (PGP RTS)
 2005. Zlatna kolekcija (Flexmedia)
 2008. Zapisano u vremenu (PGP RTS)
 2013. Predrag Cune Gojković (Gold)

See also
 Obren Pjevović
 Predrag Živković Tozovac

References

1932 births
2017 deaths
Musicians from Kragujevac
Yugoslav male singers
20th-century Serbian male singers
Serbian folk-pop singers
Burials at Belgrade New Cemetery
21st-century Serbian male singers